Established in October 2015, the All-Russia "Young Army" National Military Patriotic Social Movement Association (Всероссийское военно-патриотическое общественное движение «Юнармия», sometimes transliterated as 'Yunarmiya,' YAM) is a youth organization supported and funded by the Government of Russia through the Ministry of Defence of Russia (MOD) with a mission to train future personnel for the uniformed services and to instill the values of patriotism, national service, national and military history, remembrance of past military operations and campaigns and of the fallen of its armed forces, and to help develop the country as its population grows.

While being a successor to the military courses in both the Vladimir Lenin All-Union Pioneer Organization and the Komsomol during Soviet times, and keeping the traditions of the Great Patriotic War services of these organizations, it is affiliated with the Russian Armed Forces, DOSAAF and the MOD Armed Forces Central Sports Society.

Overview 
This national movement was a part of a larger range of youth programs, clubs and organizations which were created in 1990. The initial movement's motto was "For the glory of the Fatherland!". Modern YAM was formally established by presidential decree issued on October 29, 2015 by President of Russia Vladimir Putin at the behest of Minister of Defense General of the Army Sergey Shoygu. The Young Army Movement's aims are to improve the state policy in the field of education of the younger generation, create favorable environment for the harmonious development of the personality of children and young people, the formation of moral values and guidelines, as well as education in military and patriotic themes.

Thus, the Young Army Cadets (Юнармеец), as they are called, are from a wide number of youth groups and the Cadet Corps and Schools all over the country, the latter preparing youth for service within the Armed Forces. The YAM thus forms the military division of the wider Russian Youth and Students Movement, formed in 2015 under the Federal Service of Supervision of Education and Science, Ministry of Education and Science of the Russian Federation. 

Critics have described the organization as the Russian equivalent of the Hitler Youth and a modern, republican form of the Soviet Komsomol and Young Pioneers. In 2016 Russian minister of defense Sergei Shoigu stated that allegations over increased militarization of Russians were "far from true". Nevertheless, 6 years later, during Russian invasion of Ukraine, the same Minister of Defense commissioned reports on the possibility of recruiting 17-year old Yunarmy youth for the war effort.

Uniform and traditions 
Young Army Cadets are distinguished by their red berets. Young Army Movement members wear gray uniforms (used since early 2016), while their component organizations and Cadet Corps wear their own uniforms (the latter military-styled), with peaked caps (summer, ushankas during the winter in some cases) and/or sailor caps (the latter for naval cadets). Colour guard escorts occasionally sport sabres while in the full dress or service uniform on parades.

Leadership 
The heads of the regional branches are selected at the rallies of the Yunarmiya. In October 2016, ex-commander of the Russian Airborne Forces Vladimir Shamanov was elected as the head of the Moscow Branch of the organization. The regional headquarters of the Moscow Oblast is headed by the Olympic champion Alexander Legkov. The main headquarters of the includes famous athletes, cosmonauts and actors. In October 2017, Yelena Slesarenko, two-time world champion in jumping, was appointed Chief of Staff at the Yunarmiya Main Staff. Since 2018, Nikita Mikhalkov has been the senior mentor of the Yunarmiya.

Chief of the Main Staff 
The organization is led by a person holding the position of Chief of the Main Staff of the National Movement. He or she is responsible for the overall supervision of the National Movement and its partner and affiliate organizations.

 Dmitry Trunenkov (2016–2018), a Russian bobsledder and Olympic champion
 Major (ret) Roman Romanenko (2018-2020), a retired cosmonaut at the Yuri Gagarin Cosmonaut Training Center
 Nikita Nagornyy (since December 19, 2020), a Russian artistic gymnast and Olympic champion

Activities of the Young Army Movement 

The basic activities of YAM range from preparation for military services to participation in social events like celebrations.

Firearm training
First aid and medical assistance
 Pathfinding
 Ceremonial duties: including guardianship, marching, arms drill, giving oath etc.
 Hand combat and martial arts
Historical events reenactment
 Marching band activities and musical training

The Central Band of Young Army Cadet Movement was established in 2014. Since December 2017, the team has been actively participating in the concert activities of the Consolidated Children and Youth Brass Bands of Moscow.

Events 
YAM participated in Russian International Army Games military competition event.

Sanctions 
In July 2022 the EU imposed sanctions on Young Army Cadets National Movement in relation to the 2022 Russian invasion of Ukraine.

See also 
 Cadet Corps (Russia)
 Junior Reserve Officers' Training Corps (United States)

References

External links

Russian military youth groups
Organizations established in 2015
Ministry of Defence (Russia)